Col. J. A. Banks House is a historic home located at St. Matthews, Calhoun County, South Carolina. It was built about 1893, and remodeled in 1909–1910. It is a two-story, asymmetrical plan dwelling that incorporates both Classical and Victorian elements.  The house features two Neo-Classical colossal Corinthian order porticos and gable pediments with Palladian windows. Also on the property are two one-story, weatherboarded contributing outbuildings: a fowl house and a workshop.  It was the home of South Carolina State Representative and State Senator Col. J. A. Banks.

It was listed in the National Register of Historic Places in 1980.

References

External links

Historic American Buildings Survey in South Carolina
Houses on the National Register of Historic Places in South Carolina
Neoclassical architecture in South Carolina
Houses completed in 1910
Houses in Calhoun County, South Carolina
National Register of Historic Places in Calhoun County, South Carolina